Teddy David Schneider (born November 23, 1988 in Califon, New Jersey) is an American soccer player.

Career

College and amateur
Schneider attended Delbarton School, and played four years of college soccer at Princeton. He initially began his career as a midfielder but was converted to left/right back during his third year at Princeton. In his four years at Princeton Schneider appeared in 69 matches and scored 7 goals and provided 8 assists.

Schneider played with Central Jersey Spartans in the USL Premier Development League during their 2010 inaugural season.

Professional
Schneider was selected 31st overall in the 2011 MLS Supplemental Draft by the New York Red Bulls. He spent pre-season with the club and eventually signed a contract on April 12, 2011. On June 28, 2011 Schneider made his first team debut for Red Bulls in a 2-1 victory over FC New York in the US Open Cup.

Schneider was waived by New York on November 23, 2011.

References

External links
Princeton Profile

1988 births
Living people
American soccer players
Central Jersey Spartans players
New York Red Bulls players
Princeton Tigers men's soccer players
USL League Two players
Delbarton School alumni
People from Califon, New Jersey
Sportspeople from Hunterdon County, New Jersey
Soccer players from New Jersey
New York Red Bulls draft picks
Association football midfielders
Association football fullbacks